Vuontisjärvi is a small lake and a village located in Finnish Lapland. It belongs to Kemijoki main catchment area.

The area of the lake was reduced greatly in 1861. During the spring flood the waters escaped through a ditch dug by a local man, and a new river formed. The new water level is six metres below the original.

See also
List of lakes in Finland

References

Landforms of Lapland (Finland)
Lakes of Enontekiö